The Uthuru Janani Power Station (also sometimes called the New Chunnakam Power Station, as it is the replacement of the former Chunnakam Power Station) is a  thermal power station commissioned on 1 January 2013, in Chunnakam, Sri Lanka. The power station consists of three diesel-run generating units with a capacity of  each, producing  annually.

The facility also consists of in-house refinery, fuel storage, and waste disposal system.

See also 
 Northern Power Station
 List of power stations in Sri Lanka

References

External links 
 
 
 
 

Oil-fired power stations in Sri Lanka
Buildings and structures in Jaffna District